The World Information Service on Energy (WISE) is an anti-nuclear group founded in 1978 to be an information and networking center for citizens and organizations concerned about nuclear power, radioactive waste, radiation and sustainable energy issues.  The organization advocates the implementation of safe, sustainable solutions such as energy efficiency and, renewable energy.

Since 2001, WISE is affiliated with the Nuclear Information and Resource Service (NIRS).

International Offices
Paris
The former executive director of WISE-Paris, Yves Marignac, was recognized in 2012 by the Nuclear-Free Future Foundation in the "Solution" category.

References

Anti–nuclear power movement
Nuclear safety and security
International sustainability organizations
Organizations established in 1978
1978 establishments in the Netherlands